Azkajwar II (died 712) was the ruler of the Afrighid dynasty of Khwarezm from an unknown date to 712. He was the son and successor of Sabri. Azkajwar II is agreed by most scholars to be the same person as king Jigan or Chigan. In most medieval sources, he is simply called Khwarazmshah (king of Khwarazm).

Biography

Azkajwar is first mentioned in the mid-690s, when his kingdom was invaded by Umayya ibn Abdallah, who was the Abbasid governor of Khurasan. Azkajwar's capital, Kath, was shortly captured Umayya, who forced Azkajwar to recognize Abbasid suzerainty. However, after Umayya left Khwarazm, Azkajwar declared independence from the Abbasid Caliphate. During the early 700s, Yazid ibn al-Muhallab, the new Abbasid governor of Khurasan, invaded Khwarazm but was eventually repulsed by the forces of Azkajwar.

Azkajwar is later mentioned in 712, when he was faced by a rebellion of his younger brother Khurrazadh, and had tensions with his rival, the king of Khamjird. Unable to solve his problems, he secretly sent envoys to the new Abbasid governor of Khwarazm, Qutayba ibn Muslim, who was at that time in Merv. Azkajwar and Qutayba shortly made an agreement that Azkajwar would recognize Abbasid authority in return for military aid against his brother. Qutayba shortly sent an army under his brother Abd al-Rahman to Hazarasp, where he defeated and killed the king of Khamjird, and captured 4,000 of his soldiers, who were shortly executed. Meanwhile, Qutayba defeated the supporters of Khurrazadh and captured the latter, who was given to Azkajwar who shortly had him executed.

However, an anti-Abbasid rebellion shortly broke out in Khwarazm, which resulted in the overthrow and death of Askajwar, and the coronation of an Afrighid prince named Khusrau as the king of Khwarazm. However, Khusrau was shortly defeated and killed by the Abbasids, who made Azkajwar's son Askajamuk II the new ruler of Khwarazm.

References

Sources

Further reading
 

712 deaths
Year of birth unknown
8th-century Iranian people
Afrighids
Zoroastrian rulers